State Route 5 (SR 5) is a  north–south state highway in western Alabama, United States. While it once extended – prior to the renumbering of the highways of Alabama in 1957– from Mobile north to the Tennessee state line, and was one of the major routes between Mobile and Birmingham, it has since been shortened to about half of its former length, and superseded by newer highways such as Interstate 65 (I-65) and SR 157.

Route description

In a way, SR 5 is two separate highways. The first leg of its route begins at the present southern terminus of SR 5 at its intersection with U.S. Route 43 (US 43) at Thomasville. For the next , it proceeds northeasterly towards Birmingham, passing through the rural areas of the Black Belt. In northern Bibb County, SR 5 joins US 11, I-20, and I-59, and these continue their route to the northeast.

The second section of SR 5 begins near the historic Legion Field stadium in Birmingham, where US 11 and SR 5 intersect with US 78. At that point, the concurrency of US 11 and SR 5 ends, and the -long concurrency of US 78 and SR 5 begins. US 78 and SR 5 formerly traveled concurrently from Birmingham to Jasper, passing through the Birmingham suburbs of Forestdale, Adamsville, and Graysville. With the completion of much of I-22 in northwestern Alabama, US 78 and SR 5 now split at Graysville, with US 78 now being routed on I-22. At Jasper, SR 5 forks away from the former routing of US 78, continuing through the rural areas of Walker County and Winston County. The northern terminus of SR 5 is at its junction with US 278 and SR 13 at Natural Bridge.

History
In the original numbering of state roads in the mid-1920s, the highway that would become SR 5 had several numbers. SR 6 was the highway from Mobile north via Thomasville to Selma. SR 35 split from SR 6 at Safford and ran northeast near Woodstock, where traffic could continue to Birmingham on SR 2 (US 11). SR 43 split from SR 8 (US 78) at Jasper, taking traffic from Montgomery via US 78 to Phil Campbell.

SR 43 also traveled southwest from Jasper to SR 33 at the village of Bankston, though the exact route had not been defined by 1927. From there, travelers could continue north on part of SR 5 to Florence, and SR 50 to the Tennessee state line, where the road became Tennessee State Route 6 towards Lawrenceburg, Tenn., and Nashville, Tenn.

By late 1928, a large renumbering of highways had been carried out. The new SR 5 stretched from Mobile to Tennessee via Birmingham and Florence, and included several former routes: most of SR 6, all of SR 35, most of SR 43, part of SR 5, and all of SR 50. The remainders of SR 35 and SR 43 became parts of SR 22 and SR 18. The old SR 5 was split among several routes. The two halves of the new SR 5 were linked between somewhere near Woodstock and Jasper by a concurrency with SR 7 (US 11) and SR 4 (US 78) via Birmingham. US 43 was added to the route south of Thomasville and north of Phil Campbell in 1933 or 1934. In between those two, SR 5 used a shorter route, mainly SR 13.

Except for minor relocations and widenings, SR 5 remained the same until the 1950s. Around 1950, a new highway, running southeast from SR 5 at Haleyville to local roads at Natural Bridge, was added to the state highway system as SR 195.

Maintenance by the Alabama Highway Department was extended southeast from Natural Bridge to SR 5 near Jasper by 1957. In that year, in the renumbering of the state highways of Alabama, substantial changes were made to the route of SR 5. Both portions of it that had been concurrencies with US 43 – south of Thomasville and north of Phil Campbell – became SR 13, which essentially became the unsigned partner to US 43 across the state. SR 13 used a shorter highway between Bankston and Haleyville, joining SR 5 at Natural Bridge and making the north end of SR 5 an overlap with SR 13. US 43 has never been moved to this route.

In addition, SR 5 and SR 195 were swapped between Jasper and Haleyville, giving SR 5 a more direct route that had just been paved. This removed almost half of the original SR 5, leaving it a reflected C-shaped route, with both ends of connecting with US 43, and its eastmost point in Birmingham.

Major intersections

See also

 List of highways numbered 5

References

External links

005
Transportation in Clarke County, Alabama
Transportation in Wilcox County, Alabama
Transportation in Marengo County, Alabama
Transportation in Dallas County, Alabama
Transportation in Perry County, Alabama
Transportation in Bibb County, Alabama
Transportation in Tuscaloosa County, Alabama
Transportation in Jefferson County, Alabama
Transportation in Birmingham, Alabama
Transportation in Walker County, Alabama
Transportation in Winston County, Alabama